Varnavaj (also Romanized as Varnāvaj; also known as Venārch, Arnāvej, Venāj, Venārej, Venārj, and Vināj) is a village in Kahak Rural District, Kahak District, Qom County, Qom Province, Iran. At the 2006 census, its population was 895, in 236 families.

References 

Populated places in Qom Province